Daniel Matthew Feehan (7 February 1880 – 21 March 1946) was an Australian rules footballer who played with St Kilda in the Victorian Football League (VFL).

Notes

External links 

1880 births
1946 deaths
Australian rules footballers from Victoria (Australia)
St Kilda Football Club players
South Ballarat Football Club players
People from Daylesford, Victoria